Ohio's 7th senatorial district has consisted of portions of southwestern Ohio, and currently consists of Warren County and portions of the counties of Butler and Hamilton.  It encompasses Ohio House districts 27, 54 and 62.  It has a Cook PVI of R+15.  The district was represented by the Senate President from 1997 to 2002 with Senator Richard Finan.  Its current Ohio Senator is Republican Steve Wilson.  He resides in Maineville, a city located in Warren County, Ohio.

List of senators

References

External links
Ohio's 7th district senator at the 130th Ohio General Assembly official website

Ohio State Senate districts